Fulera Limann (born 8 November 1945) was a First Lady in the third republic of Ghana as the wife of the late Hilla Limann.

The late Hilla Limmann was overthrown by former President Jerry John Rawlings in 1981. Fulera said the overthrown of her husband did not come as a shock to her as it was something they both had expected.

References 

First ladies of Ghana
1945 births
Living people